Robert 'Robbie' Dixon (born January 4, 1985) is a Canadian alpine skier.

Dixon was born in North Vancouver, British Columbia, Canada. He has been skiing since 2001 in North America, before first skiing World Cup  2006  Lake Louise, Alberta finishing 46th overall best  Super G. In March 2008,  finished  4th place  World Cup Super G Kvitfjell, Norway.  best finish  next year Kvitfjell finished fifth.

In 2010 Olympic Games, Dixon competed in the downhill, but failed to finish.

References

1985 births
Alpine skiers at the 2010 Winter Olympics
Canadian male alpine skiers
Living people
Olympic alpine skiers of Canada
People from North Vancouver